Ticho Parly (né Frederick Christiansen) (16 July 1928 – 21 June 1993) was a Danish-born Heldentenor who sang leading roles in most of the major opera houses of Europe as well as the United States, including the Metropolitan Opera, where he debuted in 1966 as Tristan opposite Birgit Nilsson in Tristan und Isolde.

Biography
Parly was born in Copenhagen on 16 July 1928. He began singing as a treble in his homeland, and grew into a bass-baritone.  After studying in Denmark, France, Italy and Switzerland, as well as Indiana University, he went to New Orleans, where he resided from 1957 to 1960. There he studied with Charles Paddock (also the teacher of Thaïs St Julien, Anthony Laciura and Greer Grimsley) who "insisted" he become a tenor. In 1958 he made his operatic debut with the New Orleans Opera Association, in the secondary role of Pong in the local premiere of Turandot, conducted by Renato Cellini.  The next year, he sang Flavio in Norma, as well as in Eine Nacht in Venedig, this last for The Experimental Opera Theatre of America.

Within a few months, however, Parly was starring in Continental theatres, including Aachen where he sang Radamès in Aïda.  In the next few seasons, he would become acclaimed as one of the world's leading Heldentenors, appearing at Brussels (Les contes d'Hoffmann staged by Maurice Béjart, 1961), Wuppertal (as Mephisto in Busoni's Doktor Faust and in Peter Grimes, 1962), Lisbon (the Kaiser in Die Frau ohne Schatten, 1962; and Herodes in Salome, 1975), Kassel (Die Frau ohne Schatten and Siegfried, 1962; and Tannhäuser conducted by Christoph von Dohnányi, 1964), Amsterdam (Doktor Faust, 1962; and as Prince Chouïsky in Boris Godunov, 1989), and Vienna (Ariadne auf Naxos, 1965; Der fliegende Holländer, 1967; and Einem's  Der Besuch der alten Dame, 1973).

In the summer of 1963, he made his debut at the Bayreuth Festival as Kunz Vogelgesang in Wieland Wagner's production of Die Meistersinger, with Anja Silja as Eva.  In 1966 he returned for the leading role of Siegmund in Die Walküre and, two years later, portrayed Siegfried in Siegfried (which he also sang at the Salzburg Festival, under Herbert von Karajan) and Götterdämmerung. These were his last appearances at Bayreuth.

For the San Francisco Opera, he was seen in Die Frau ohne Schatten, in 1960.  In his native Copenhagen, Parly sang in Fidelio (as Florestan, 1963), Der fliegende Holländer (as Erik, 1963), Tannhäuser (1964), Elektra (as Ägisth, 1966) and Boris Godunov (directed by Harry Kupfer, 1988).

In 1965 Parly returned to New Orleans, for Tannhäuser, in Tito Capobianco's production. The same year found him in Mexico City for the same opera, now with Montserrat Caballé.  In 1966, he recorded a disc of Wagner excerpts for Deutsche Grammophon conducted by Peter Maag (published on Compact Disc in 2017, with previously-unpublished recordings of excerpts from Fidelio and Der Freischütz), and made his Covent Garden debut in Siegfried (with Hans Hotter and Sir Georg Solti) and returned for Tristan in Tristan und Isolde in 1973. In 1966, he performed in  Fidelio at the Teatro Colón; the next year he sang Tristan there.

In the summer of 1968 he made his debut at Bayerische Staatsoper in Tristan und Isolde, but the conductor, Joseph Keilberth, died conducting the second act and the performance was cancelled.

On 3 April 1966 Ticho Parly's wife Azilda gave birth to a daughter, Tina. In November the same year, he made his first appearance at the Metropolitan Opera, as Tristan opposite the Isolde of Birgit Nilsson.  Two years later he sang there in Der fliegende Holländer (with Cornell MacNeil) and Elektra (with Nilsson and Jean Madeira).  In 1967, Parly made his debut at the Teatro alla Scala in Salome, followed by Tannhäuser (1967), and returned in 1971 for the Tambourmajor in Berg's masterpiece, Wozzeck, conducted by Claudio Abbado.

In 1967 he also appeared at the Paris Opéra as Tannhäuser, and the next year as Siegmund. In 1970 he sang in concert performances of the first and third acts of Parsifal in Washington DC and New York City, with the Washington National Symphony. In 1971, he was in Der Besuch der alten Dame with Astrid Varnay, at Zurich.  The same year the tenor sang Siegfried at the Scottish Opera, following that with Peter Grimes in 1973.  Returning to the States in 1974, he portrayed Loge in Das Rheingold at the San Diego Opera conducted by Walter Herbert. Over the next few summers, he sang the same part for the Seattle Opera's production of Der Ring des Nibelungen. In 1981 he sang Loge at the Cincinnati Opera, and the following year was found singing Herodes in Salome there, with Marisa Galvany in her first assumption of the title role. The year 1983 had him in Siegfried again, for the Boston Lyric Opera.

As late as 1988, the artist appeared in Denmark in the eponymous role of Otello. In his later years, Ticho Parly taught voice in Seattle, where he died on 21 June 1993, at the age of 64.  The following 7 July, Parly's daughter, Tina, died in a rafting accident on the Yuba River in Northern California. At the time of his death, Parly was married to his second wife, the soprano Patricia Schlosstein.

References

External links 
  Ticho Parly in an excerpt from Fidelio (1966).

Sources
Bargreen, Melinda, A&E Briefing: Tito Parly Dies, Seattle Times, 1 July 1993  
Dyer, Richard  "A Tenor Who Can Last Through Wagner: Parly's in Demand", Boston Globe, 27 July 1983
Metropolitan Opera, Parly, Ticho (Tenor), Performance record on the MetOpera Database 
Morgan, Brian, "From Monkey Hill to the Green Hill: Ticho Parly," unpublished essay, 2002.

1928 births
1993 deaths
Danish operatic tenors
Heldentenors
20th-century Danish male opera singers
Singers from Copenhagen